Lindängen is a neighbourhood in Söder in Malmö, Sweden. It has 6,874 inhabitants. In its 2017 report, Police in Sweden placed the district in the most severe category of urban areas with high crime rates.

Demographics
Lindängen had 5,958 inhabitants in 2007. It increased to 6,628 in 2011. As of 2014, 6,874 live in the neighbourhood.

Sports
The following sports clubs are located in Lindängen:

 BK Olympic
 HK Malmö

Notable people
Lindängen has been home to several hip hop groups, for example Gonzalo Del Rio Saldias (Gonza Blatteskånska) from the Swedish hip hop group Advance Patrol. The rapper Lazee and Daniel Cvetkovic (Lilleman) are from Lindängen.

References

Neighbourhoods of Malmö